The dark-brown serotine (Pseudoromicia brunnea) is a species of vesper bat found in Central and West Africa.

Taxonomy and etymology
It was described as a new species in 1880 by British zoologist Oldfield Thomas.
He described the species based on individuals collected by Robb in Old Calabar, Nigeria.
Thomas initially placed the new species in the now-defunct genus Vesperugo, subgenus Vesperus (also defunct).
Its first binomial name was Vesperugo brunneus.
The species name "brunneus" is Latin for "brown".
This likely refers to its fur color.
In his description of the species, Thomas hypothesized that it was closely related to the Cape serotine, Neoromicia capensis (formerly Vesperugo capensis). In 2020, the species was reclassified in the new genus Pseudoromicia based on phylogenetic studies.

Description
Thomas described this species as dark brown, with short ears and a well-developed calcar on the uropatagium.
Its tragus is "medium length", straight, and has a flat tip.
Its wing membranes are blackish-brown in color.

Biology
Females give birth to one pup at a time.
It is parasitized by at least one species of bat fly, Basilia echinata.

Range and habitat
This species is found in several countries in West and Central Africa, including Cameroon, Congo, Côte d'Ivoire, Equatorial Guinea, Gabon, Ghana, Liberia, Nigeria, and Sierra Leone.
It is known as a rainforest specialist.

Conservation
It is evaluated as near threatened by the IUCN.
It meets the criteria for this designation because its population is likely in significant decline, but the decline is probably not greater than 30% over 10 years.
There is also widespread habitat loss throughout its known range.
The IUCN notes that the species is close to qualifying for vulnerable status.
Specific threats to this species include deforestation for timber harvest and conversion to farmland.

References

Pseudoromicia
Mammals described in 1880
Bats of Africa
Taxa named by Oldfield Thomas
Taxonomy articles created by Polbot
Taxobox binomials not recognized by IUCN